Mamta Madhi is an Indian politician. She was elected to the Odisha Legislative Assembly as a member of the Indian National Congress.

References

Living people
1971 births
Indian National Congress politicians
Women in Odisha politics
Odisha MLAs 2000–2004
Odisha MLAs 2009–2014
21st-century Indian women politicians